The Trofeo Luigi Fagioli Hillclimb is a hillclimbing competition held in Gubbio, Italy. The track hosts a round of the Italian Hill Climb Championship also known as Campionato Italiano Velocità Montagna (CIVM).

History 
The trophy was born in 1966 in honour of the Italian driver Luigi Fagioli.

List of winners

By modern cars 
Classification:

By historic cars 
Classification:

Note
 The first and the second edition, was held in the Gubbio–Mengara track;
 Since the third edition, the race was held in the Gubbio–Madonna della Cima track;
 Since 1986 edition, the race was held in two rounds;
 The 1988 edition, was held in a  track;
 The 1989 edition, was only open to historic cars;
 The 2000 edition, was held with three chicanes of "2000 type";
 The 2001 edition, was held with three chicanes of "2001 type";
 The 2002 edition, was held with three chicanes of "2002 type".

See also 
 Luigi Fagioli
 Gubbio

Notes 
1.A timing error in 2018 meant all recorded times were around two seconds lower (i.e. faster) than the true times set by each car. The time and speed quoted here have been inflated by exactly two seconds to account for this.

References

External links 
 Official web site
 The track in Google Maps

Hillclimbs
Gubbio
Motorsport venues in Italy